Ruslan Yuryevich Gazzayev (born 14 April 1991) is a Russian professional football coach and a former player who played as a midfielder. He works as a coach at the FC Dynamo Moscow academy.

Club career
He made his Russian Football National League debut for FC Volgar Astrakhan on 10 August 2014 in a game against FC Volga Nizhny Novgorod.

Personal life
He is the son of Yuri Gazzaev.

External links
 
 

1991 births
Sportspeople from Astrakhan
Living people
Russian footballers
Association football midfielders
Expatriate footballers in Latvia
Russian expatriate footballers
FC Taganrog players
FC Volgar Astrakhan players
FC Spartak Vladikavkaz players
PFC Krylia Sovetov Samara players
FC KAMAZ Naberezhnye Chelny players
Latvian Higher League players